This is a list of the tallest buildings in the state of New Hampshire that are above 150 ft based on standard height measurement. Television masts, service poles and chimneys are not included in this list.

Tallest buildings

Timeline of tallest buildings 
1819-1894: New Hampshire State House
1850-1898: Sacred Heart Catholic Church
1898-1972: St. Francis Xavier Rectory (now St. Mary & Archangel Michael Coptic Orthodox Church)
1972-1992: Hampshire Plaza (now Brady Sullivan Plaza)
1992-present: City Hall Plaza

References

External links 
 Manchester, New Hampshire, at Emporis
 History of Manchester NH

Buildings and structures in Manchester, New Hampshire
Commercial buildings in New Hampshire
Tallest
New Hampshire